Turbid Creek is a stream in southwestern British Columbia, Canada, flowing southwest into the Squamish River.

References

Rivers of British Columbia
New Westminster Land District